Shahmar-e Mirza Morad (also Romanized as Shāhmār-e Mīrzā Morād) is a village in Gurani Rural District, Gahvareh District, Dalahu County, Kermanshah Province, Iran. At the 2006 census, its population was 262, in 52 families.

References 

Populated places in Dalahu County